The  is a range of volcanic mountains in central Hokkaidō, Japan. The mountain range is made up from the Daisetsuzan Volcanic Group and the Tomuraushi Volcanic Group. The volcanoes are part of the Kurile arc of the Pacific ring of fire.

References

 Hokkaipedia, Daisetsuzan Mountains, last access 2 July 2008.

Mountain ranges of Hokkaido